Carex asturica is a tussock-forming species of perennial sedge in the family Cyperaceae. It is native to parts of Spain and Portugal.

See also
List of Carex species

References

asturica
Taxa named by Pierre Edmond Boissier
Plants described in 1852
Flora of Spain
Flora of Portugal